Firle Escarpment is a  biological Site of Special Scientific Interest north of Seaford in East Sussex.

This is a long stretch of chalk grassland on north facing slopes of the South Downs. Flora include the very rare early spider orchid and other unusual flowering plants such as pyramidal orchid, felwort, common spotted orchid, round headed rampion, clove pink and bee orchid.

References

Sites of Special Scientific Interest in East Sussex
Escarpment